"It's Love, Love, Love" is a popular song whose music was written by Joan Whitney and Alex Kramer, with lyrics by Mack David, and published in 1943.

Guy Lombardo recording
The best-known recording was by Guy Lombardo and his Royal Canadians (vocal by Skip Nelson). It was recorded on January 7, 1944, and released by Decca Records as catalog number 18589. It first reached the Billboard magazine Best Seller chart on April 6, 1944 and lasted 10 weeks on the chart, peaking at #1.

Other versions
Later in 1944, a recording  was released by The King Sisters on Bluebird Records, a subsidiary of RCA Victor, and this too charted with a peak position of #4.
The Platters included the song on their album Song for the Lonely (1962).

Popular culture
The song was included in the film Stars on Parade (1944).

References

Number-one singles in the United States
1943 songs
Songs with lyrics by Mack David
Songs written by Joan Whitney (songwriter)
Songs written by Alex Kramer
Bluebird Records singles